Edwin John Dwane (17 July 1896 – 10 February 1973) was an English footballer who made 46 appearances in the Football League for Lincoln City as an inside left or left half. He also played in the Midland League for Lincoln City, and in non-league football for Boston Town, Newark Town and Worksop Town.

References

1896 births
1973 deaths
People from Valletta
Association football inside forwards
Association football wing halves
Lincoln City F.C. players
Newark Town F.C. players
Worksop Town F.C. players
English Football League players
Midland Football League players
English footballers